Longpont Abbey (Abbaye Notre-Dame de Longpont) was a Cistercian monastery, in present-day Longpont, Aisne, France.

It existed from 1131 to 1793, being founded by monks from the abbey of Clairvaux, at the behest of Jocelin of Soissons. There is now a hotel on the site, located in the old Cistercian inn. The roofless abbey church can be visited, along with the better-preserved buildings around the cloister. The original buildings suffered war damage in 1918.

Its monks included Petrus Cantor and John de Montmirail.

Burials
Raoul II, Count of Vermandois
Eleanor, Countess of Vermandois
Jean de Montmirail

References
Pickard, Charlotte (2015) "Unequal Marriage in Medieval France: The Case of the Vermandois Heiresses" DOI: 10.6084/m9.figshare.4286954.v1
Poquet, Monographie de l'abbaye de Longpont (Paris: 1869)

Notes

External links
 
 
 

Cistercian monasteries in France
1131 establishments in Europe
1130s establishments in France
Christian monasteries established in the 12th century
1793 disestablishments in France